Buena Vista Farms is a historic home located near Old Fields, Hardy County, West Virginia, USA. It was listed on the National Register of Historic Places in 1985.

The main house at Buena Vista Farms was built in 1836 and is a brick dwelling in the Greek Revival style.  Also on the property is a large Gothic Revival style frame bank barn dated to 1904.  The house is one of four significant Van Meter family dwellings — the others being Traveler's Rest, Fort Pleasant, and the Garrett VanMeter House.

References

Dutch-American culture in West Virginia
Farms on the National Register of Historic Places in West Virginia
Gothic Revival architecture in West Virginia
Greek Revival houses in West Virginia
Houses completed in 1836
Houses in Hardy County, West Virginia
Houses on the National Register of Historic Places in West Virginia
National Register of Historic Places in Hardy County, West Virginia
1836 establishments in Virginia